The Patient Safety and Quality Improvement Act of 2005 (PSQIA): , 42 U.S.C. ch. 6A subch. VII part C, established a system of patient safety organizations and a national patient safety database. To encourage reporting and broad discussion of adverse events, near misses, and dangerous conditions, it also established privilege and confidentiality protections for Patient Safety Work Product (as defined in the act). The PSQIA was introduced by Sen. Jim Jeffords [I-VT]. It passed in the Senate July 21, 2005 by unanimous consent, and passed the House of Representatives on July 27, 2005, with 428 Ayes, 3 Nays, and 2 Present/Not Voting.

Context for the passage of the Act 

The Notice of proposed rulemaking for this law describes the reason Congress passed it.

Summary of the act's major sections

Definitions 

Patient Safety Organization (PSO) must certify that it supports the requirements in the PSQIA and be listed on the Agency for Healthcare Research and Quality (AHRQ) web site.

The definition of Patient Safety Work Product (PSWP) is quite broad. Patient safety work product includes any data, reports, records, memoranda, analyses (such as root cause analyses), or written or oral statements (or copies of any of this material), which are assembled or developed by a provider for reporting to a PSO and are reported to a PSO; or are developed by a patient safety organization for the conduct of patient safety activities; and which could result in improved patient safety, health care quality, or health care outcomes; or which identify or constitute the deliberations or analysis, or identify the fact of reporting pursuant to a patient safety evaluation system (42 USC 299b-21(7)(A)).

However, patient safety work product does not include a patient's medical record, billing and discharge information, or any other original patient or provider records; nor does it include information that is collected, maintained, or developed separately, or exists separately, from a patient safety evaluation system.

Privilege and confidentiality protections 

Patient Safety Work Product must not be disclosed, except in very specific circumstances and subject to very specific restrictions.

Note: the Patient Safety Activities Exception is the most common one that providers and PSOs will be working with.

Permitted Disclosures

 Patient Safety Activities — PSWP may be disclosed:
 Between the Provider and the PSO — i.e.:
 From the provider to the PSO, for Patient Safety Activities, and
 From the PSO to the disclosing provider, for Patient Safety Activities
 To a contractor of a Provider or a PSO
 For contracted Patient Safety Activities
 Contractor may not further disclose, except back to the contracted provider or PSO
 Among affiliated providers, for Patient Safety Activities
 From one PSO to another PSO or another provider, if
 Direct identifiers (which are defined in the regulations) of any providers, affiliated organizations, corporate parents, subsidiaries, practice partners, employers, members of the workforce, or household members of such providers are removed; and
 With respect to any Individually identifiable health information within the PSWP, a limited data set (also defined by regulation) is produced
 Business operations — A provider or PSO may disclose to attorneys, accountants or other professionals for business operations purposes.
 Further disclosure (except back to the contracting entity) is prohibited
 Authorized by identified providers — Disclosure is permitted if all identified providers authorize the disclosure.
 Authorization must be in writing, signed by the provider, and
 Must state the nature and scope of the disclosure
 Accrediting bodies (e.g., The Joint Commission) — PSWP may be (but is not required to be) disclosed to an accrediting body if:
 Any identified provider agrees to the disclosure; or
 Direct identifiers of any provider (or affiliated organizations, corporate parents, subsidiaries, practice partners, employers, members of the workforce, or household members) are removed
 Nonidentifiable PSWP — May be disclosed
 The regulations set out specific requirements for "nonidentification."
 Research — This exception allows disclosure to researchers conducting certain types of research projects. If protected health information is involved, the HIPAA privacy and security rules also apply.
 Food and Drug Administration (FDA) — PSWP may be disclosed to the FDA
 By a provider concerning an FDA-regulated product or activity,
 By an entity required to report to the FDA about the quality, safety, or effectiveness of an FDA-regulated product or activity, or
 By a contractor acting on behalf of the FDA or entity for these purposes
 Law enforcement — PSWP may be disclosed to law enforcement personnel
 If the information relates to an event that either constitutes the commission of a crime, or for which the disclosing person reasonably believes constitutes the commission of a crime, provided that the disclosing person believes, reasonably under the circumstances, that the patient safety work product that is disclosed is necessary for criminal law enforcement purposes
 Criminal proceedings — But only after a court makes an in camera (in closed chambers) determination that:
 The PSWP contains evidence of a criminal act;
 The PSWP is material to the proceedings; and
 The PSWP is not reasonably available from any other source
 Disclosure to permit equitable relief for reporting individuals — This exception allows use of PSWP by individuals who claim they have been the victim of an adverse employment action because the individual reported information to a PSO (either directly to the PSO or with the intent of having it reported to the PSO)
 There must be a "protective order" issued by the court or administrative tribunal to protect the confidentiality of PSWP used in the proceeding

Violations & Enforcement

 An individual who knowingly or recklessly violates the confidentiality provisions is subject to a civil penalty of up to $10,000 for each act constituting such violation.
 Safe Harbor — a provider whose workforce member discloses PSWP is not deemed to have violated the Act if that workforce member disclosure does not include written or oral statements that:
 Assess the quality of care of an identifiable provider, or
 Describe or pertain to one or more actions or failures to act by an identifiable provider

 Note: the individual workforce member of the provider would still be subject to possible penalties if the disclosure is knowing or reckless. This safe harbor does not apply to the PSO itself — i.e., a PSO workforce member's disclosure is attributable to the PSO.

The Act is enforced by the Secretary of Health and Human Services

 PSWP may be disclosed to (and the Secretary may require disclosure of PSWP) to investigate or determine compliance with the Patient Safety Act or with HIPAA.

Network of patient safety databases

Patient Safety Organization certification and listing 

: only officially listed PSOs may display this logo.

See also 
 Medical error
 Patient safety
 Listed Patient Safety Organization
 Safety engineering

References

Further reading 
 
 White paper describing interaction of PSQIA and California laws

External links 
 AHRQ FAQ for the Patient Safety and Quality Improvement Act
 Listed Patient Safety Organizations
 PSO Common Formats

Acts of the 109th United States Congress
Evidence-based medicine
Healthcare in the United States
Patient safety
Safety
United States federal health legislation